The 2019 Torneio Internacional de Futebol Feminino (officially the 2019 Torneio Uber Internacional de Futebol Feminino for sponsorship reasons) was the ninth edition of the Torneio Internacional de Futebol Feminino, an invitational women's football tournament held in Brazil.

Format

Venues
All matches took place at Pacaembu Stadium in São Paulo.

Squads

Matches
All times are local (UTC-3).

Bracket

Final

Final results

Goalscorers

References

External links
Official Official Tournament Page in Portuguese

2019 in women's association football
2019 in Brazilian women's football
2019